CAAB may refer to:
Civil Aviation Authority of Bangladesh
Civil Aviation Authority of Botswana
Codes for Australian Aquatic Biota